Dust-to-Digital is a record company that specializes in documenting the history of American popular music, including historical recordings of blues, gospel, and country music. Their method combines rare recordings with historic images, photographs, and detailed texts describing artists and their works. The company has won a Grammy Award and a Living Blues award.

History
In February 1999, after taking over an Atlanta college radio station and becoming frustrated at the unavailability of gospel music from before 1940, Lance Ledbetter formed his own label and set out on a search for rare recordings of gospel music. After five years of research, Ledbetter issued Goodbye, Babylon on his newly formed Dust-to-Digital label. The six-CD box set, containing gospel music from 1902 to 1960, and accompanied by a 200-page book and hand-packed with raw cotton in a wooden box, was well-reviewed. The company's success has been partly attributed to its distinctive packaging, presenting products in pine boxes, silk screen, and raw cotton.

The young record company followed up the set with Where Will You Be Christmas Day? Since 2004, Dust-to-Digital has issued more than 60 titles. A box set chronicling the origins of recorded music in Georgia was planned but never completed.

Excavated Shellac 

Excavated Shellac, started in 2007 as a website of "a 78-collector" released Excavated Shellac: An Alternate History of the World’s Music that consists of 100 recordings and 100 stories in 186-page book by Jonathan Ward. The digital album was nominated for Grammy 2022 as Best Historical Album. The album was described as "a sonic smorgasbord from across the globe unfolds: Afghanistan, Sudan, the Kingdom of Yugoslavia, Uganda, Spain, Albania, Mongolia, Mexico and onwards and onwards."

Dust-to-Digital also published Opika Pende: Africa at 78 RPM, Excavated Shellac: Reeds, and Excavated Shellac: Strings.

Releases

References

Notes

American record labels
Blues record labels
Jazz record labels
Folk record labels
Reissue record labels
Record labels established in 1999
American companies established in 1999
1999 establishments in Georgia (U.S. state)